The following lists events that happened during 1821 in Australia.

Incumbents
Monarch - George IV

Governors
Governors of the Australian colonies:
Governor of New South Wales- Major-General Lachlan Macquarie until 1 December 1821, succeeded by Thomas Brisbane.
Lieutenant-Governor of Tasmania - Colonel William Sorell

Events
 3 February - Sir Thomas Brisbane is commissioned as Governor to succeed Macquarie. He replaces Macquarie on 1 December of the same year.
 February - John Bigge finishes gathering evidence on all aspects of the colonial government, including finances, the church, the judiciary, and the convict system. He then sails back to England.
 1 May - The Australian Magazine, Australia's first periodical, begins publication.
 29 October - Governor Macquarie lays foundation stone for first Catholic church in Australia, St Mary's.
 The Female Factory, for women convicts, is separated from the Parramatta Gaol. Many women are selected as brides or for domestic service.
 Parramatta Marist High School, Australia's first private school, founded by John Joseph Therry.
 Wool export in Australia - 75,400 pounds.

Exploration and settlement
 March – Port Macquarie, a penal settlement, was established for convicts that had committed secondary crimes in New South Wales.

References

 
Australia
Years of the 19th century in Australia